Chittagong Circular Railway is a suburban railway system in the city of Chittagong in Bangladesh to ameliorate the commuters' suffering and improve traffic situation in the city. The construction was complete by February 2013 and it became operational by May the same year. The railway is served by high speed DEMU commuter trains, procured from China.

References 

Transport in Chittagong
Public transport in Bangladesh
5 ft 6 in gauge railways in Bangladesh